Jeff Michael Andrews (January 20, 1960-March 14, 2019) was an American jazz and jazz fusion bassist who contributed significantly to jazz fusion in the 1980s. He taught at the Manhattan School of Music, SUNY Purchase, The New School and Mannes School of Music and collaborated with a number of musicians.

Discography 

 2010: Dave Stringer, Joyride. Jeff Andrews: Guitar (Acoustic), Bouzouki, Hammer Dulcimer 
 2009: Danny Paradise, Travelers, Magicians & Shamans. Jeff Andrews: Bass, Bass Engineer, Bass (Electric), Percussion, Percussion Engineer 
 2009: Blues Devine, Shine like the Sun. Jeff Andrews: Percussion 
 2008: Ironweed, Indian Ladder. Jeff Andrews: Member of Attributed Artist, Vocals 
 2007: Debbie Dean, Grove House. Jeff Andrews: Audio Production, Bass, Guitar (Bass), Main Personnel, Producer 
 2006: Blues Divine / Philippo Franchini, That's What It Takes. Jeff Andrews: Percussion 
 2006: Michael Brecker, Michael Brecker Band in Japan. Jeff Andrews: Bass 
 2005: Jimi Tunnell, Trilateral Commission. Jeff Andrews: Bass (Electric), Guitar (Bass), Main Personnel 
 2003: Dreamzfate, Pound That Rock. Jeff Andrews: Engineer, Mixing 
 2001: Joe Rathbone, Welcome to Your New Life. Jeff Andrews: Bass 
 2001: Studio X: Live Denver. Jeff Andrews: Bass 
 2000: Vital Information, Live Around the World: Where We Come from Tour 1998-1999. Jeff Andrews: Composer 
 2000: Debbie Deane, Debbie Deane. Jeff Andrews: Bass 
 1999: The Blue Note Years, Vol. 7: Blue Note Now & Then. Jeff Andrews: Composer 
 1998: Vital information, where we come from. Jeff Andrews: Bass (Acoustic), Bass (Electric), Composer 
 1998: Birth of Cool Funk Vintage Jams, Boxed Set. Jeff Andrews: Bass (Electric) 
 1997: Yule Be Boppin'. Jeff Andrews:	Guitar (Electric) 
 1997: Babatunde Olatunji, Love Drum Talk. Jeff Andrews: Main Personnel, Bass (Electric), Fretless Bass, Bass 
 1996: Vital Information, Ray of Hope. Jeff Andrews: Bass, Composer
 1996: Mike Stern, Between The Lines. Jeff Andrews: Bass, Guitar (Bass)
 1995: Matalex, Wild Indian Summer. Jeff Andrews: Bass
 1995: Jazz Á Go-Go 1995. Jeff Andrews: Bass
 1994: Carola Grey, The Age of Illusions. Jeff Andrews: Bass
 1994: Joe Locke, Longing. Jeff Andrews: Bass
 1994: Tom Coster, The Forbidden Zone. Jeff Andrews: Bass, Bass (Electric)
 1993: Terri & Monica, Systa: Jeff Andrews: Bass
 1993: Special EFX, Special EFX Collection. Jeff Andrews: Bass
 1993: Weller Bros., Coast to Coast. Jeff Andrews: Bass
 1992: Vital Information, Easier Done Than Said. Jeff Andrews: Keyboards, Bass, Composer
 1992: Steps Ahead, Yin Yang. Jeff Andrews: Bass, Bass (Acoustic), Bass (Electric)
 1992: Haru Takuchi with Wayne Shorter, The Galactic Age. Jeff Andrews: Bass (Electric)
 1992: Bob Mintzer, I Remember Jaco. Jeff Andrews: Bass (Electric), Guitar (Bass), Guitar (Electric)
 1992: Blue Guitar. Jeff Andrews: Bass (Electric)
 1992: Jimi Tunnel, Jimi Tunnel.
 1991: Eliane Alias, A Long Story. Jeff Andrews: Bass
 1991: Haru Takuchi, 10 Billion Stars, Toshiba EMI.
 1990: GRP New Magic Digital Sampler, Vol. 3. Jeff Andrews: Bass
 1990: Kenneth Sivertsen, Flo. Jeff Andrews: Bass
 1990: Joe Locke, Longing, Steeple Chase.
 1989: Mike Stern, Jigsaw. Jeff Andrews: Bass (Electric), Fretless Bass, Guitar (Bass), Guitar (Electric)
 1988: Mike Stern, Time And Place. Jeff Andrews: Bass (Electric), Fretless Bass, Bass, Guitar (Bass)
 1988: Earth City Expressway. Jeff Andrews: Bass
 1988: Michael Brecker, Don't Try This At Home. Jeff Andrews: Guest Artist, Bass (Electric), Bass
 1988: Michael Brecker Band, Live in Berlin, German Independent.
 1988: Bireli Lagrene, Foreign Affairs, Blue Note.
 1988: Bob Berg, Cycles. Jeff Andrews: Electric Bass.
 1987: Bob Berg, Short Stories. Jeff Andrews: Bass, Composer.
 1987: Bob Berg, Bob Berg, Denon.
 1987: Special EFX, Mystique.
 1986: Mike Stern, Upside down. Jeff Andrews: Bass.
 1986: Kramer Daniels, Sleepover. Jeff Andrews: Bass
 1986: Special EFX, Slice of Life.
 1986: Kenneth Sivertsen, High Tide. Jeff Andrews: Bass. 
 1985: Special EFX, Modern Manners.

References

External links
Discogs, Jeff Andrews 

1960 births
2019 deaths
American jazz bass guitarists
Guitarists from New York (state)
21st-century American bass guitarists
20th-century American bass guitarists
Jazz musicians from New York (state)
State University of New York at Purchase faculty
Jazz fusion bass guitarists
Mannes College The New School for Music faculty
Manhattan School of Music faculty